Hermann Heinrich Howaldt (5 January 1841, Braunschweig - 2 December 1891, Braunschweig) was a German sculptor, metal caster and repoussé artist.

Life 
He was the fifth child of sculptor, metal caster and Professor Georg Ferdinand Howaldt and began his artistic studies in his father's workshop. When they were completed, the shop became "Georg Howaldt and Son". He married Helene Brust in 1872 and they had six children. 
 
After 1880, he managed all of the company's commissions and, following his father's death, operated the foundry as well. His own death came eight years later in a tragic manner. While installing his statue Fame on the glass dome of the Dresden Academy, he fell from the scaffolding. His long-term employees joined with sculptor , took a lease on the shop, and completed all the works in progress.

By 1903, the shop was having economic difficulties. Hermann's son Ferdinand (who had learned metal casting at the Braunschweig University of Technology) became the manager in an effort to save it but, three years later, had to declare bankruptcy.

Selected projects 
 Gauß-Statue, (1880), after a design by Fritz Schaper, Braunschweig
 Johann Sebastian Bach Memorial, (1883), after a design by Adolf von Donndorf, Eisenach
 Atlas Group, on the roof of the Frankfurt Hauptbahnhof, (1888)
 Statue of Germania, on the Siegesdenkmal (Victory Monument) in Leipzig, after a design by Rudolf Siemering (1888). It was removed in 1946. Apparently, a faction of the Social Democratic Party felt that it had Nazi overtones.

Sources 
 Hermann Kindt: "Georg Howaldt und seine Werkstatt", in: Braunschweiger Kalender 1957, pps.36-40
 Gerd Spies: Braunschweiger Goldschmide, Klinkhardt & Biermann (1996)

External links 

 Howaldt Family website
 Siegesdenkmal Leipzig
 Mendelssohn Memorial

1841 births
1891 deaths
German sculptors
German male sculptors
Artists from Braunschweig
People from the Duchy of Brunswick
19th-century sculptors
Deaths from falls